Isobel Mary Lambot (21 July 1926 – found 3 July 2001) was a British writer of crime fiction. She also published works under the pen names Mary Turner and Daniel Ingham.

She was born in Birmingham. Lambot earned a BA from the University of Liverpool and a teaching certificate from the University of Birmingham. She married Maurice Edouard Lambot in 1959. From 1973 to 1980, she tutored evening classes in creative writing.

Lambot left a residential home in Kington on 21 June 2001. After an extensive search by police and local volunteers, she was found dead in Yeld Wood, Hergest Ridge on 3 July.

Selected works 
 Taste of Murder (1966)
 Shroud of Canvas (1967)
 Point of Death (1969)
 Watcher on the Shore (1971)
 Contract for Death (1972) as Daniel Ingham
 The Justice Hunt (1975), as Mary Turner
 Runaway Lady (1980), as Mary Turner
 The Craft of Writing Crime Novels (1992), non-fiction

References 

1926 births
2001 deaths
English crime fiction writers
English women novelists
Writers from Birmingham, West Midlands
Alumni of the University of Liverpool
Alumni of the University of Birmingham